Hidden Creek Glacier is in North Cascades National Park in the U.S. state of Washington and is on the northwest slope of Hagan Mountain. Retreat of this glacier from 1979 to 2005 exposed several rock outcroppings in the middle of the glacier. The terminus of Hidden Creek Glacier only retreated  between 1979 and 2011, however the increase in area of exposed rock outcroppings in the middle of the glacier indicates rapid thinning.

See also
List of glaciers in the United States

References

Glaciers of the North Cascades
Glaciers of Whatcom County, Washington
Glaciers of Washington (state)